Namco Museum Remix is a 2007 video game compilation developed and published for the Wii by Namco Bandai Games. The compilation includes nine Namco arcade games and five "remix" games made specifically for this compilation. A remake, Namco Museum Megamix, was released exclusively in North America on November 26, 2010; the game features nine other arcade games alongside the titles from the original, as well as an additional remix game based on Grobda.

Overview
Namco Museum Remix is part of the Namco Museum series of arcade compilations. Just like with other Namco Museum games, it includes a collection of classic arcade titles. However, these are actually ports, rather than being emulated, and are presented in the same style as in Namco Museum Battle Collection for the PlayStation Portable. This game also adds five "Remix" versions with updated graphics and gameplay which differs from the originals in some cases significantly. For example, in Galaga Remix, players not only have to protect themselves, but also protect Pac-Man as he rolls through space. The "Remix" games feature Miis, and each minigame is presented as an "attraction" in an amusement park.

Namco Museum Megamix
An enhanced version, entitled Namco Museum Megamix, was released on November 16, 2010, in North America only. Megamix features all of the titles from the earlier version, and adds a "Remix" version of Grobda, the original versions of the "Remix" titles (excluding Pac 'n Roll and Gator Panic), plus Bosconian, Dig Dug II, Galaga, Grobda, King & Balloon, Motos,  New Rally-X, Pac-Man, and Rally-X. Megamix features a level select feature for all original arcade games with the exception of Cutie Q.

Reception

Namco Museum Remix received generally unfavorable reviews on Metacritic whereas Namco Museum Megamix received mixed to average reviews.  Namco Museum Remix received mixed reviews with a score of 55.05% on GameRankings. Criticisms focused on a lack of classic arcade games such as Pac-Man and Ms. Pac-Man, the inclusion of largely obscure titles such as Pac & Pal, Cutie Q, and Super Pac-Man and for the "Remix" games being "almost unplayable".
Namco Museum Megamix also received mixed reviews with a score of 60.33% on GameRankings.
The Megamix version was criticized for not including a wider variety of Namco games, as well as being little more than just a repackaging of 2007's Namco Museum Remix with slight changes. Both Remix and Megamix were also criticized for the unnatural and awkward control schemes with the Wii Remote, Nunchuk, and Classic Controller, as well as the lack of GameCube controller support. Other criticisms include that the visuals of the "Remix" games are pale in comparison to other Wii titles, the hub world being confusing when toggling between games, and the lack of bonus content and leaderboards for both versions.

Legacy 
The Pac-Motos and Pac n' Roll Remix games from the compilation are included in Pac-Man Museum +, with Pac-Motos being presented as an unlockable title.

See also
Namco Museum
List of Bandai Namco video game compilations

References

Notes

2007 video games
2010 video games
Bandai Namco video game compilations
Namco games
Wii games
Wii-only games
Video games developed in Japan
Video games set in amusement parks